Larry Wayne Tearry (born April 24, 1956) is a former American football center who played two seasons with the Detroit Lions of the National Football League (NFL). He was drafted by the Detroit Lions in the fourth round of the 1978 NFL Draft. He played college football at Wake Forest University and attended E.E. Smith High School in Fayetteville, North Carolina.

References

External links
Just Sports Stats

Living people
1956 births
Players of American football from North Carolina
American football centers
African-American players of American football
Wake Forest Demon Deacons football players
Detroit Lions players
People from Harnett County, North Carolina
21st-century African-American people
20th-century African-American sportspeople